A saber, or sabre, is a type of sword.

Saber may also refer to:

People
Saber (artist), (born 1976), American graffiti artist and painter

Given name
Saber Abar (born 1984), Iranian actor and theater director
Saber Ben Frej (born 1979), Tunisian football player
Saber Chebana (born 1983), Algerian football player
Saber Eid (born 1959), Egyptian football player
Saber Safar, a Free Syrian Army colonel and defector from the Syrian Army
Saber Khalifa (born 1986), Tunisian football player
Saber Mirghorbani (born 1983), Iranian football player
Saber Rebaï (born 1967), Tunisian pan-Arab singer and composer
Saber Souid (born 1981), Tunisian athlete and hammer thrower

Surname
Abdelilah Saber (born 1974), Moroccan football player
Alber Saber (born c. 1985), Egyptian computer science student and blogger 
Ashraf Saber (born 1973), Italian athlete and runner of Egyptian descent
Danny Saber (born 1966), American musician, audio engineer, record producer, and remixer
Hoda Saber (1959–2011), Iranian scholar, journalist and activist
Mahfouz Saber, Egyptian judge and politician
Moinul Ahsan Saber (born 1958), Bangladeshi fiction writer
Reza Olfati-Saber, Iranian American Aroboticist

Fictional characters
 Saber (Fate/stay night), a fictional character from the Japanese visual novel and anime series
 Mark Saber, fictional character from the series ABC Mystery Theater, The Vise, and Saber of London
 Kamen Rider Saber, the main character in Kamen Rider Saber

Other uses
Kamen Rider Saber, a 2020-21 Japanese tokusatsu series produced by Toei and TV Asahi
Saber (software), a simulation program
Saber Interactive, a video game developer
Saber Radar, a project of the Brazilian Army
Saber squadron, an army combat unit 
SS-20 Saber, NATO reporting name of Soviet missile RSD-10 Pioneer
Systems Approach for Better Education Results (SABER), a World Bank Group initiative

See also

 Sabre (disambiguation)
 Sabir (disambiguation)
 Beit Saber, a village in southern Syria
 Lightsaber, a fictional weapon
 Sabero, a municipality in Castile and León, Spain
 Sabor, Croatian Parliament
 Sabur, a village in Iran